Fuzhong is a metro station in New Taipei, Taiwan served by the Taipei Metro.

Station overview
This five-level, underground station has two stacked side platforms and three exits. Its location is where the old TRA Banqiao Station used to reside.

Design
The piece "Poetry on the Move" is an interactive bulletin board. It consists of a computer-operated LED matrix display in the form of a triangulated strip. The project invites participants to upload text messages and post poetry for public display.

Station layout

Around the Station
Historical Sites
 Lin Family Mansion and Garden
Night Markets
 Nanya Night Market
 Huangshi Market
Museums
 Fuzhong 15
Parks
 Jieshou Park
Shopping Malls
 Eslite Bookstore Banqiao Store
Schools and Government Offices
 Banqiao Elementary School
 Banqiao High School
 Banqiao District Office
 Banqiao Farmer's Association
Banks
 Bank of Taiwan Banqiao Branch
 Taiwan Business Bank Banqiao Branch

References

Railway stations opened in 2006
Bannan line stations
Banqiao District